Big Brother 15 is the fifteenth season of various versions of Big Brother and may refer to:

 Big Brother 15 (U.S.), the 2013 edition of the U.S. version
 Big Brother 15 (UK), the 2014 edition of the UK version
 Gran Hermano 15, the 2014 edition of the Spanish version
 Big Brother Brasil 15, the 2015 edition of the Brazilian version

See also
 Big Brother (franchise)
 Big Brother (disambiguation)